The 2017 Japan Women's Sevens is the fourth tournament of the 2016–17 World Rugby Women's Sevens Series and the inaugural edition of the Japan Women's Sevens. It is scheduled for the 22–23 April 2017 at the Honjo Athletic Stadium in Kitakyushu.

Format
The teams are drawn into three pools of four teams each. Each team plays every other team in their pool once. The top two teams from each pool advance to the Cup/Plate brackets while the top 2 third place teams also compete in the Cup/Plate. The other teams from each group play-off for the Challenge Trophy.

Teams
The participating teams include:

Pool stage

Pool A

Pool B

Pool C

Knockout stage

Challenge Trophy

5th Place

Cup

Tournament placings

Source:

See also
 World Rugby Women's Sevens Series
 2016–17 World Rugby Women's Sevens Series
 World Rugby

References

2017
2016–17 World Rugby Women's Sevens Series
2017 in women's rugby union
2017 in Japanese women's sport
April 2017 sports events in Japan
Sevens